Typhoon Ruth was a typhoon that hit Japan in October 1951.

Preparations 

Storm warnings were issued for southern Japan on October 13. Planes in Tokyo were grounded and courier service to Korea was suspended.

Impact 

Ruth impacted Japan between October 13–15, killing 572 people and injuring another 2,644; 371 people were left unaccounted for. Many of these deaths arose from river flooding triggered by Ruth. The storm damaged 221,118 homes and 9,596 ships, as well as some 3.5 million bushels of rice. Due to Ruth's large size, much of the country was affected by the typhoon's winds and rains. Yamaguchi Prefecture was most severely impacted by the typhoon. Coastal areas were inundated and communications were disrupted. American military installations throughout Japan incurred over US$1 million in damage. Overall property damage in Japan was estimated at US$25 million, affecting an estimated 123,773 people; total damage to property, crops, and forests reached US$55 million.

See also 

 1951 Pacific typhoon season

References 

1951 in Japan
History of Yamaguchi Prefecture
Typhoons in Japan
1951 Pacific typhoon season